was a Japanese former hurdler who competed in the 1956 Summer Olympics, in the 1960 Summer Olympics, and in the 1964 Summer Olympics.

Died 17 March 2020 due to pneumonia.

References

1934 births
2020 deaths
Japanese male hurdlers
Japanese male sprinters
Olympic male hurdlers
Olympic male sprinters
Olympic athletes of Japan
Athletes (track and field) at the 1956 Summer Olympics
Athletes (track and field) at the 1960 Summer Olympics
Athletes (track and field) at the 1964 Summer Olympics
Asian Games gold medalists for Japan
Asian Games silver medalists for Japan
Asian Games bronze medalists for Japan
Asian Games medalists in athletics (track and field)
Athletes (track and field) at the 1958 Asian Games
Athletes (track and field) at the 1962 Asian Games
Medalists at the 1958 Asian Games
Medalists at the 1962 Asian Games
Japan Championships in Athletics winners
20th-century Japanese people
21st-century Japanese people